The Enjalran River is a tributary of the Turgeon River, flowing into the township of Enjalran in the municipality of Eeyou Istchee Baie-James (municipality), in the administrative region from Nord-du-Québec, Quebec, Canada.

Forestry is the main economic activity of the sector; recreational tourism activities, second.

The surface of the river is usually frozen from the end of November to the end of April, however safe ice circulation is generally from early December to mid-April.

Geography 
The surrounding hydrographic slopes of the Enjalran River are:
North side: Turgeon River (Harricana River), Quésagami Creek;
East side: Santoire Creek, Théo River;
South side: Enjalran Lake, Turgeon River (Harricana River), Makwo Creek;
West side: Turgeon River (Harricana River), Kaokonimawaga Creek.

The Enjalran River rises at the mouth of lake Enjalran (length: ,) in Enjalran Township located at:
 West of Enjalran Hills;
 East of the border Ontario - Quebec;
 south of the mouth of the Enjalran River;
 north-east of downtown La Sarre.

From its source, the "Enjalran River" flows over  entirely in forest zone according to these segments:
 Northward, to the outlet of Lac Chicoyne (coming from the East);
 Northward, to the outlet of Lake Henri (coming from North-East);
 Northward to the mouth of the river.

The mouth of the "Enjalran River" that flows to the east bank of the Turgeon River is located in the forest zone at:
 upstream of the mouth of the Detour River;
 East of the border Ontario - Quebec;
 South-East of the mouth of the Turgeon River;
 North of La Sarre, Quebec city center.

Toponymy 
The term "Enjalran" refers to a family name of French origin. The term "Enjalran" is used in the following place-names located in the same area in the Nord-West of Quebec province: Enjalran Township, Enjalran Hills, Enjalran River and Enjalran Lake.

The toponym "Enjalran River" was formalized on December 5, 1968, at the Commission de toponymie du Québec, at the creation of this commission.

Notes and references

See also 

Harricana River, a watercourse
James Bay
Jamésie
Eeyou Istchee Baie-James (municipality), a municipality
List of rivers of Quebec

Rivers of Nord-du-Québec